Dzorastan is a village in the Kapan Municipality of the Syunik Province in Armenia.

Etymology 
The village was previously known as Khlatag and Akhtakhana.

Demographics 
The Statistical Committee of Armenia reported its population was 61 in 2010, down from 115 at the 2001 census.

References 

Populated places in Syunik Province